Namuno District is a district of Cabo Delgado Province in northern Mozambique. It covers 6,037 km² with 211,737 inhabitants (2015).

External links
Government profile 

Districts in Cabo Delgado Province